Girl at the Window is a 2022 Australian film directed by Mark Hartley and produced by Antony I. Ginnane who had previously collaborated on Patrick (2013).

Premise
A teenage girl thinks the man next door might be a serial killer. Matters are complicated when he starts dating her mother.

Cast
Ella Newton
Radha Mitchell
Karis Oka
Vince Colosimo

Production
Filming took place in Melbourne during COVID lockdowns.

References

Exterior links
Girl at the Window at Screen Australia
Girl at the Window at IMDB
Girl at the Window at Letterbox DVD
2022 films
Australian thriller films
2020s English-language films
Films shot in Melbourne
Films directed by Mark Hartley
Screen Australia films
2020s Australian films